Edmund Hownde, D.D.  was a priest and academic in the 16th century.

Hownde was born in Calais and educated at Trinity College, Cambridge, graduating BA in 1564, M.A.in 1567 and B.D. in 1574. He was a Fellow of Caius from 1573 to 1576; and Master of St Catharine's from 1577.  Hownde was ordained on 20 January 1573. He was a Chaplain to Queen Elizabeth. He also held livings at Burton Coggles and Symondsbury, where he died in 1598.

References

1598 deaths
Alumni of Trinity College, Cambridge
Fellows of Gonville and Caius College, Cambridge
Masters of St Catharine's College, Cambridge
People from Calais
16th-century English Anglican priests
Honorary Chaplains to the Queen